William, Willie, Bill, or Billy Burton may refer to:

Academics
 William Burton (antiquary, died 1645) (1575–1645), author of The Description of Leicestershire, 1622, English translator of Achilles Tatius
 William Burton (antiquary, died 1657) (1609–1657), English schoolmaster and antiquary

Arts and entertainment
 William Evans Burton (1804–1860), British actor and playwright
 William Shakespeare Burton (1824–1916), English genre and historical painter
 William Burton Walbert (1886–1959), American singer and composer
 William Francis Burton (1907–1995), British marine and landscape artist
 Rahn Burton (William Burton, 1934–2013), American jazz pianist
 Willie D. Burton, American production sound mixer

Politics and law
 William Burton (Leicester MP) (fl. 1360s), represented Leicester (UK Parliament constituency)
 William Burton (died 1781) (c. 1695–1781), British Member of Parliament for Rutland 1730–1734
 William Burton (governor) (1789–1866), governor of Delaware 
 William Westbrooke Burton (1794–1888), British judge in New South Wales, Australia
 William Burton (Canadian politician) (1888–1944), mayor of Hamilton, Ontario
 W.E. Burton (fl. 1910s), chief magistrate of Anguilla
 Bill Burton (political consultant) (born 1977), American political consultant
 William C. Burton, American lawyer

Sports
 William Burton (golfer) (1875–1914), American golfer
 Bill Burton (baseball) (fl. 1918), American baseball player
 Bill Burton (athlete) (1915–1984), American Olympic athlete
 Bill Burton (cricketer) (1922–2000), New Zealand cricketer
 William Burton (swimmer) (born 1941), Australian Olympic swimmer
 Billy Burton (born 1956), English motorcycle speedway rider
 Willie Burton (born 1968), American basketball player

Others
 William Burton (clergyman) (died 1616), English clergyman
 W. K. Burton (William Kinnimond Burton, 1856–1899), British engineer, photographer and photography writer
 William Merriam Burton (1865–1954), American chemist
 William John Burton (1908–1985), New Zealand lithographic draughtsman, rifleman and archer

Other uses
 Bill Burton Fishing Pier State Park, Maryland